Jean Ballesdens (1595 in Paris – 1675 in Paris) was a French lawyer, editor and bibliophile, though he has left practically no writings. He is the first known collector of books with historic bindings.

Biography
A lawyer to the parlement de Paris and secretary to chancellor Séguier, he was elected to the Académie française in 1648 - though he had renounced a place when it was first offered him, in favour of Pierre Corneille. He collected books and formed a library that was the rival of his master's in terms of numbers, choice and the editions' beauty. Notable books from it were the nine volumes in Grolier bindings.

References

External links 
 Académie française (in French)
 Le Roux de Lincy, "Researches Concerning Jean Grolier: His Life and His Library."(Grolier Club, 1907) pp.90-92

1595 births
1675 deaths
Lawyers from Paris
French book and manuscript collectors
Members of the Académie Française